Walter Gibson may refer to:

Walter B. Gibson (1897–1985), American author and magician
Walter M. Gibson (1822–1888), American adventurer, Mormon missionary, and government official in the Kingdom of Hawaii
Walter Maxwell Gibson (1930–2009), American chemist
Walter S. Gibson (1932–2018), American art historian
Walter Gibson (Lord Provost), Scottish merchant and Lord Provost of Glasgow